Arenimonas oryziterrae is a Gram-negative, aerobic and rod-shaped bacterium from the genus of Arenimonas which has been isolated from rhizosphere soil from a rice plant (Oryza sativa) from Jinju in Korea.

References

Xanthomonadales
Bacteria described in 2009